The Institute of Sonology is an education and research center for electronic music and computer music based at the Royal Conservatoire of The Hague in the Netherlands.

Background

The institute was founded at Utrecht University in 1960 under the name STEM ("Studio for Electronic Music") as a successor to the former studio for electronic music at Philips Research Laboratories in Eindhoven. In 1964, Gottfried Michael Koenig became the studio's artistic director. The studio grew under Koenig's leadership, and in 1966 an annual international electronic music course was founded which exists to this day.

In 1967 STEM was renamed as the "Institute of Sonology". International attention increased in 1971 with the purchase of a PDP-15 computer which was used to develop programs for algorithmic composition and digital sound synthesis. During the early years of the institute, a series of landmark programs were developed there, including Koenig's Project 1, Project 2, and SSP, Paul Berg's PILE, Werner Kaegi's MIDIM/VOSIM, and Barry Truax's POD.
In 1971 the Brazilian composer Jorge Antunes, a precursor of electronic music in his country, was a student at the Institute where he composed the work "Para Nascer Aqui".

In 1986, the institute was moved to the Royal Conservatory of The Hague, hosting the International Computer Music Conference there during its inaugural year.

Current research focuses on algorithmic composition, live electronic music, historical reconstructions of electronic and computer music (including György Ligeti's Pièce électronique Nr. 3 and Edgard Varèse's Poème électronique), field recording, sound installations, and sound spatialization. Alongside the annual one-year course, the institute offers bachelor's and master's degrees.

Discography
 Gottfried Michael Koenig – The Electronic Works (1990) BV Haast
 His Master's Noise (2001) BV Haast
 Kees Tazelaar – Electronic compositions (2004) Near
 Institute of Sonology: Early Electronic Music 1959–1969 (2009) Sub Rosa

Notable teachers and alumni

 Ángel Arranz
 Clarence Barlow
 Jorge Antunes
 Richard Barrett
 Justin Bennett
 Paul Berg
 Konrad Boehmer
 Darien Brito
 Nuno Canavarro
 Luc Döbereiner
 Cathy van Eck
 Barbara Ellison
 Angel Faraldo
 Raviv Ganchrow
 Kathrin Grenzdörfer
 Marie Guilleray
 Bjarni Gunnnarsson
 Edwin van der Heide
 Werner Kaegi
 Ji Youn Kang
 Roland Kayn
 Gottfried Michael Koenig
 Fani Konstantinidou
 Johan van Kreij
 Otto Laske
 Giacomo Lepri
 Cort Lippe
 Igor Lintz Maués
 Sergio Luque
 Riccardo Marogna
 Fred Momotenko
 Hugo Morales Murguia
 Yota Morimoto
 Lasse Nøsted
 Peter Pabon
 Gabriel Paiuk
 Jean Piché
 Sara Pinheiro
 Kees van Prooijen
 Takayuki Rai
 Joel Ryan
 Robert Rowe
 Wouter Snoei
 Peter Struycken
 Kees Tazelaar
 Stan Tempelaars
 Roland Kuit
 Barry Truax
 Henry Vega
 Claude Vivier
 Rodney Waschka II
 Frits Weiland
 Anne Wellmer
 Amnon Wolman
 Semay Wu
 Andrea Young

References

External links

Electronic music organizations
Music organisations based in the Netherlands
Royal Conservatory of The Hague
1960 establishments in the Netherlands
Organizations established in 1960